Meconopsis grandis, the Himalayan blue poppy, is a species of flowering plant in the poppy family Papaveraceae, native to China (Yunnan), Bhutan, North East India and Nepal.

Large, showy, pure blue flowers with a prominent yellow central boss are produced in late Spring.

The plant is valued as an ornamental, but is notably difficult to grow in normal garden conditions. Though perennial it can be short-lived. It prefers an evenly cool temperature and shaded conditions, in somewhat acid soil which remains reliably moist.

The following cultivars are recipients of the Royal Horticultural Society's Award of Garden Merit:
 'Bobby Masterson'  (syn. 'Betty Sherriff's Dream Poppy')
 'Mrs Jebb'

References

grandis
Flora of Bhutan
Flora of China
Flora of India (region)
Flora of Nepal